Gambassi Terme is a comune (municipality) in the Metropolitan City of Florence in the Italian region Tuscany, located about  southwest of Florence. It is named after the Gambassi Family; a part of the Florentine Nobility that has resided in the area since the 1350s.

Main sights
The church of San Giovanni Battista, in the frazione of Varna, which houses a replica of Andrea del Sarto's Madonna with Child and Saints.
The Romanesque Pieve of Santa Maria Assunta (12th century)
Parco Comunale, former garden of the Villa Sinnai.

References

External links

 Official website

Cities and towns in Tuscany